Rakhi Sawant (Fatima Adil Khan Duranni; born Neeru Bheda; 25 November 1978) is an Indian dancer, model, actress and television talk show host, who has appeared in many Hindi and a few Kannada, Marathi, Odia, Telugu and Tamil films. She was a contestant on the first season of the Indian reality television series Bigg Boss 1 (2006) and a challenger and finalist in Bigg Boss 14 (2020). Sawant has established herself as a sex symbol in Bollywood.

Sawant launched her own political party, headed by Jai Shah, called the Rashtriya Aam Party, to contest the 2014 Lok Sabha Elections. However, after the election, she joined Republican Party of India (A).

Early life 
Rakhi was born as Neeru Bheda to Maya Bheda. Maya married Anand Sawant, a police constable at Worli Police Station. She took the surname of her step-father.

Career

Career beginnings (1997–2005)
She made her film debut in the 1997 film Agnichakra under the name Ruhi Sawant. She went on to other small roles and dance numbers in Bollywood films Joru Ka Ghulam, Jis Desh Mein Ganga Rehta Hain, and Yeh Raaste Hain Pyaar Ke.

In 2003, she auditioned for an item number in the Bollywood film Chura Liyaa Hai Tumne. She auditioned about four times before being selected for her breakthrough item number, "Mohabbat Hai Mirchi", composed by Himesh Reshammiya. Sawant acted in small roles in films including Masti and Main Hoon Na.

In 2005, she appeared in the music video "Pardesiya", from the album D.J. Hot Remix - Vol 3.

Television debut and success (2006–present)
In June 2006, Mika Singh attempted to kiss her at his birthday party, which caused a media controversy. A few months later, she appeared in the first season of the reality show Bigg Boss. She got evicted in week 4 but later made a re- entry. She was among the top four finalists but got evicted days before the grand finale (24 January 2007, Day 84).
In 2007, Rakhi made her singing debut in the album Super Girl launched by Venus Records & Tapes Pvt. Ltd. She later participated in the dance reality show Nach Baliye with Abhishek Avasthi and emerged as the first runner up. In 2008, Sawant appeared in the film Krazzy 4 for the item song 'Dekhta Hai Tu Kya'. In 2009, Sawant launched the reality show Rakhi Ka Swayamwar in which she planned to select her future husband by the ancient ritual of Swayamvar. On 2 August 2009 she chose her life partner, a contestant from Toronto, Canada, Elesh Parujanwala. However, several months later, Sawant announced that the couple had separated due to irreconcilable differences. After separation she said on interview that she got engaged to Elesh Parujanwala for money.

In 2010, Rakhi hosted a talk show Rakhi Ka Insaaf which aired on Imagine TV. The show saw a controversy after the death of a participant after Rakhi had called him impotent. In 2011, she participated in Sony TV's Maa Exchange along with mother Jaya Sawant.

Often appearing in reality shows as a host, judge or participant, Sawant is a regular stage performer. In 2012, she did a comedy act with Shahrukh Khan and Ranbir Kapoor at the 57th Filmfare Awards and entry dance performance in 2015 with Ranveer Singh and Arjun Kapoor in Malaysia.

In 2013, she participated in Welcome – Baazi Mehmaan Nawazi Ki along with Anchal Sabharwal,	Sangram Singh, Chetan Hansraj & Madhura Naik. The show aired on Life OK. She later was a contestant on Box Cricket League.

Sawant later played the leading role in thriller film Ek Kahani Julie Ki, and was seen in a cameo appearance in comedy fiction television series Bhaag Bakool Bhaag.

From 2020 to 2021, Sawant appeared as a challenger in Bigg Boss 14. She emerged as a finalist but decided to walk out, opting for the cash prize of 14 lakhs.

Political venture (2014–present) 
On 26 March 2014, she announced her plans to contest 2014 Lok Sabha elections from Mumbai North-West as an Independent Candidate. On 28 March, she founded the Rashtriya Aam Party (RAP). The party has no symbol assigned by the election commission. However, Sawant said that she's expecting it to be a "green chilli", which she feels resembles her personality. The party's office bearers and fundraisers are local businessmen from Oshiwara.

She received only 15 votes from the Mumbai North-West Constituency and lost her deposit.

Sawant resigned from the Rashtriya Aam Party and joined the RPI (Athavale) party in June 2014 and expressed her desire to work for dalits. Rakhi serves as party's state vice-president and president of the woman wing.

Personal life
In 2019, Sawant married an NRI man named Ritesh, which soon ended in divorce in early 2022. In May 2022, she married her boyfriend of few months Adil Khan Durrani.

Injury
In November 2018, during The Great Khali's Continental Wrestling Entertainment promotion, American female wrestler Rebel got involved in a dance battle against Sawant, during which Rebel grabbed her in a bear hug and threw her on her back. It injured Sawant's back and she fell unconscious. She was taken to a nearby hospital.

Controversy
On 4 April 2017, she was arrested by Punjab police about her remarks on Rishi Valmiki.

Criticism began against Sawant when rumors spread over her conversion to Islam after marrying her boyfriend Adil Durrani, with people even saying that she changed her name to Rakhi Sawant Fatima. However Adil denied the marriage at first but soon after some weeks he had accepted his marriage with Rakhi.

Filmography

Films

Dance numbers

Television

Other television appearances
 2003: Carry On Shekhar  (SAB TV)
 2006: Jeena Isi Ka Naam Hai (Zee TV)
 2007: Let's Talk...  (Zoom TV)
 2007: Aap Ki Adalat (India TV) (later in 2008 and 2009) (Star Plus)
 2007: Baa Bahoo Aur Baby (Season 1) (Star Plus)
 2007: Koffee with Karan (Season 2) (STAR One)
 2008: Bigg Boss 2 (Colors)
 2008: 10 Ka Dum (season 1) (Sony TV)
 2009: Nach Baliye 4 (STAR Plus)
 2009: Boogie Woogie (Sony TV) (later in 2011)
 2009: Lux Perfect Bride (STAR Plus)
 2010: Bigg Boss 4 (Colors)
 2010: Jubilee Comedy Circus (Sony TV)
 2011: Comedy Circus 3 Ka Tadka (Sony TV)
 2011: Ratan Ka Rishta (NDTV Imagine)
 2011: Sheela, Shagun and Meenakshi (STAR News)
 2011: Shaadi 3 Crore Ki (NDTV Imagine)
 2012: Bigg Boss 5 (Colors)
 2012: All Most Famous (Zoom TV)
 2012: Jhalak Dikhhla Jaa 5 (Colors)
 2012: Bigg Boss 6 (Colors)
 2012: Movers & Shakers Masala Markey  (SAB TV)
 2014: Comedy Nights with Kapil (Colors)
2015: Comedy Classes (Life OK)
2015: Chidiya Ghar(SAB TV)
2016: Comedy Nights Bachao (Colors)
2017: Bhaag Bakool Bhaag (Colors) as Twinkle Maa
2019: Kanala Khada (Zee Marathi) as Guest
2021: Indian Idol 12 (Sony TV) as Guest
2021: Bigg Boss OTT (Colors) as Guest
2021: Bigg Boss 15 (Colors) as Guest

Music videos

References

External links

 
 
 

Actresses in Hindi cinema
Indian television actresses
21st-century Indian actresses
Converts to Christianity
Indian television talk show hosts
Actresses in Tamil cinema
Participants in Indian reality television series
Living people
1978 births
Actresses from Mumbai
Candidates in the 2014 Indian general election
Republican Party of India (Athawale) politicians
Marathi politicians
Maharashtra politicians
Actresses in Telugu cinema
Actresses in Marathi cinema
Politicians from Mumbai
Indian actor-politicians
Actresses in Hindi television
Women in Maharashtra politics
20th-century Indian actresses
21st-century Indian women politicians
21st-century Indian politicians
Bigg Boss (Hindi TV series) contestants
Bigg Boss Marathi contestants